Next Generation Missile Vessels (NGMVs) are a planned class of anti-surface warfare corvettes for the Indian Navy. Under this programme the Indian Navy intends to acquire six advanced missile vessels. Ships in this class will be armed with Anti-ship missile or Land-attack missile like BrahMos. Ships under this class will feature advanced stealth features like a low radar cross section (RCS), infrared, acoustic and magnetic signatures.

Development 
On 2 January 2015 the Ministry of Defence (MOD) issued a Request For Information (RFI) under Buy Indian and Make Indian category for six new missile corvettes by initiating the Next Generation Missile Vessels (NGMVs) programme. Vendors who chose to respond to the RFI must meet "minimum qualifying criteria" mainly, shipyard should have already built "vessel(s) of similar specifications". An RfP worth $2.2 billion was filed by the Government of India to various Indian shipyards seeking for various warships including six missile boats.

On 23 February 2021, Cochin Shipyard won the bid to construct 6 Next Generation Missile Vessels for a cost ₹10,000 crores.

Design and description 
The RFI suggests that ships will be about 2,200-2,800 tonnes each. The new ships will have a complement of 11 officers, 2 trainee officers and 80 sailors. The range will be at least  ( at full speed) and speed performance will be  (max speed of ). The ships will carry eight surface-to-surface missiles, a full-fledged surface-to-air missile (SAM) system with point defence capabilities and a  range MR gun system. The ships will also have radar and electro-optically (EO) guided close-in weapon systems (CIWS) with 360-degree anti-missile defence.

See also 
 Project 75I-class submarine
 
 Indian Navy Multi-Role Support Vessel programme
 Future of the Indian Navy

References 

Naval ships of India
Ships built in India